The Tucumã State Park is a state park in the state of Mato Grosso, Brazil.

Location

The Tucumã State Park is in the Colniza municipality of Mato Grosso.
The park is bounded by the border with the state of Amazonas to the north, and adjoins the Manicoré State Forest and the Campos Amazônicos National Park in Amazonas. To the east it borders the Rio Roosevelt Ecological Station.
It surrounds the Rio Madeirinha Ecological Station on the west, north and east.
The Madeirinha River forms the western boundary between the state park and the Rio Madeirinha Ecological Station, then runs northwest into the Manicoré State Forest.
The MT-418 runs to the south of the park.

History

The consultative council was created on 15 December 2014.

Notes

Sources

State parks of Brazil
Protected areas of Mato Grosso
Protected areas established in 2002
2002 establishments in Brazil
.